The women's high jump event  at the 1980 European Athletics Indoor Championships was held on 1 March in Sindelfingen.

Results

References

High jump at the European Athletics Indoor Championships
High
Euro